Heneage Finch, 1st Earl of Nottingham, PC (23 December 162018 December 1682), Lord Chancellor of England, was descended from the old family of Finch, many of whose members had attained high legal eminence, and was the eldest son of Sir Heneage Finch, Recorder of London, by his first wife Frances Bell, daughter of Sir Edmond Bell of Beaupre Hall, Norfolk.

Early career

In the register of Oxford University, he is entered as born in Kent, and probably his native place was Eastwell in that county. He was educated at Westminster and at Christ Church, Oxford, where he remained until he became a member of the Inner Temple in 1638. He was called to the bar in 1645, and soon obtained a lucrative practice.

Career
In April 1660, he was elected Member of Parliament for Canterbury and Mitchell in the Convention Parliament and chose to sit for Canterbury. Shortly afterwards was appointed Solicitor General, being created a baronet the day after he was knighted. In May 1661 he was elected MP for Oxford University in the Cavalier Parliament. In 1665 the university created him a D.C.L. In 1670 he became Attorney General, and in 1675 Lord Chancellor. He was created Baron Finch in January 1673 and Earl of Nottingham in May 1681.

Popish Plot

During the Popish Plot, he played an active part in the interrogation of witnesses and preparation of the Crown's evidence. He is said to have been sceptical about the credibility 
of much of the evidence, and drew up a private report referring to the difficulties with Titus Oates' testimony. In general he behaved with moderation and restraint during the Plot, as shown most notably in his impartial conduct, as Lord High Steward, of the trial of William Howard, 1st Viscount Stafford, (apart from a curious remark that it was now clear that the Great Fire of London was a Catholic conspiracy). Kenyon notes that during the examination of the informer Miles Prance, Finch threatened him with the rack, but such a lapse was most uncharacteristic of Finch, who was a humane and civilised man; in any case, the threat could hardly have been serious since the use of the rack had been declared illegal in 1628.

Finch and Nottingham House, now Kensington Palace

The original early 17th-century building was constructed in the village of Kensington as Nottingham House for the Earl of Nottingham. It was acquired from his heir, who was Secretary of State to William III, in 1689, because the King wanted a residence near London but away from the smoky air of the capital, because he was asthmatic. At that time Kensington was a suburban village location outside London, but more accessible than Hampton Court, a water journey on the Thames. A private road was laid out from the Palace to Hyde Park Corner, broad enough for several carriages to travel abreast, part of which survives today as Rotten Row. The Palace was improved and extended by Sir Christopher Wren with pavilions attached to each corner of the central block, for it now needed paired Royal Apartments approached by the Great Stairs, a council chamber, and the Chapel Royal. Then, when Wren re-oriented the house to face west, he built north and south wings to flank the approach, made into a proper cour d'honneur that was entered through an archway surmounted by a clock tower. Nevertheless, as a private domestic retreat, it was referred to as Kensington House, rather than 'Palace'. The walled kitchen gardens at Kensington House supplied fruits and vegetables for the Court of St. James's.

Personal life
On 30 July 1646, he was married to Elizabeth Harvey, daughter of William Harvey's younger brother Daniel, and his wife Elizabeth Kinnersley. Together, Elizabeth and Heneage were the parents of six children, including:

 Daniel Finch, 2nd Earl of Nottingham (1647–1730), who married Lady Essex Rich.
 Margaret Finch (1648–1700), who married Denis MacCarthy of the MacCarthy Reagh.
 Heneage Finch, 1st Earl of Aylesford (–1719), who had a distinguished career as a lawyer and politician and was Solicitor General 1679–86.
 Elizabeth Finch (1650–1675), who married Sir Samuel Grimston, 3rd Baronet. 
 William Finch
 Charles Finch

Lord Nottingham died in Great Queen Street, London on 18 December 1682. He was buried in the church of Ravenstone in Buckinghamshire. His son Daniel inherited his earldom, and would later also inherit the Earldom of Winchelsea.

Character
According to the Encyclopædia Britannica Eleventh Edition, his contemporaries on both sides of politics agree in their high estimate of his integrity, moderation and eloquence, while his abilities as a lawyer are sufficiently attested by the fact that he is still spoken of as the father of equity. His most important contribution to the statute book is The Statute of Frauds. While attorney-general he superintended the edition of Sir Henry Hobart's Reports (1671). He also published Several Speeches and Discourses in the Tryal of the Judges of King Charles 1. (1660); Speeches to both Houses of Parliament (1679); Speech at the Sentence of Viscount Stafford (1680). He left Chancery Reports in MS., and notes on Coke's Institutes.

References

External links
 
Archives and papers
 geni.com entry
 

|-

|-

|-

|-

1621 births
1682 deaths
Finch, Heneage
People educated at Westminster School, London
Alumni of Christ Church, Oxford
Attorneys General for England and Wales
701
Lord chancellors of England
Lord High Stewards
Lords of the Admiralty
Finch, Heneage
Members of the Privy Council of England
Solicitors General for England and Wales
Members of the Inner Temple
English MPs 1661–1679
Heneage
English MPs 1660
Peers of England created by Charles II
Heneage
English knights
Knights Bachelor